Bellerive Acres is a northern suburban village in St. Louis County, Missouri, United States. The population was 188 at the 2010 census. In April, 2015, the residents voted to change the village of Bellerive to a fourth class city named Bellerive Acres.

It is the former site of Bellerive Country Club, which relocated southwest to Town and Country in 1959. Much of the former golf course is now occupied by the University of Missouri–St. Louis.

Geography
Bellerive Acres is located at  (38.713301, -90.314315).

Demographics

2010 census
As of the census of 2010, there were 188 people, 82 households, and 63 families living in the then-village. The racial makeup of the village was 54.8% White, 43.1% African American, and 2.1% from two or more races.

There were 82 households, of which 24.4% had children under the age of 18 living with them, 62.2% were married couples living together, 12.2% had a female householder with no husband present, 2.4% had a male householder with no wife present, and 23.2% were non-families. 20.7% of all households were made up of individuals, and 11% had someone living alone who was 65 years of age or older. The average household size was 2.29 and the average family size was 2.63.

The median age in the village was 54.2 years. 16% of residents were under the age of 18; 3.6% were between the ages of 18 and 24; 12.7% were from 25 to 44; 46.8% were from 45 to 64; and 20.7% were 65 years of age or older. The gender makeup of the village was 46.3% male and 53.7% female.

2000 census
As of the census of 2000, there were 254 people, 96 households, and 79 families living in the city. The racial makeup of the village was 62.99% White, 33.07% African American, 1.57% from other races, and 2.36% from two or more races. Hispanic or Latino of any race were 2.76% of the population.

There were 96 households, out of which 32.3% had children under the age of 18 living with them, 69.8% were married couples living together, 11.5% had a female householder with no husband present, and 17.7% were non-families. 17.7% of all households were made up of individuals, and 7.3% had someone living alone who was 65 years of age or older. The average household size was 2.65 and the average family size was 2.92.

In the village, the population was spread out, with 27.2% under the age of 18, 4.3% from 18 to 24, 17.7% from 25 to 44, 38.6% from 45 to 64, and 12.2% who were 65 years of age or older. The median age was 45 years. For every 100 females, there were 86.8 males. For every 100 females age 18 and over, there were 81.4 males.

The median income for a household in the village was $87,400, and the median income for a family was $93,906. Males had a median income of $80,575 versus $44,583 for females. The per capita income for the village was $42,336. About 2.9% of families and 5.3% of the population were below the poverty line, including 10.6% of those under the age of eighteen and none of those 65 or over.

Education
The Chancellor's Residence of the University of Missouri–St. Louis is located in Bellerive Acres.

Police Services
Police services are provided by contract with the neighboring city of Normandy.

References

Villages in St. Louis County, Missouri
Villages in Missouri